Héctor Aguilar Camín (born July 9, 1946) is a Mexican writer, journalist, and historian, director of Nexos magazine. Nexos was fined and banned for two years (2020-2022) from contracts with the Mexican Government (which had provided the magazine's funds) for illicit financing. This decision was later reversed by the Tribunal Federal de Justicia Administrativa (TFJA).

Born in Chetumal, Quintana Roo, Aguilar Camín graduated from the Ibero-American University with a bachelor's degree in information sciences and received a doctorate's degree in history from El Colegio de México. In 1986 he received Mexico's Cultural Journalism National Award and three years later he received a scholarship from the John Simon Guggenheim Memorial Foundation while working as a researcher for the National Institute of Anthropology and History.

As a journalist, he has written for La Jornada (which he also co-edited), Unomásuno and currently for Milenio. He edited Nexos and hosted Zona abierta, a weekly current-affairs show on national television. He has worked as a researcher at the National Institute of Anthropology and History (INAH) was editorial director of literary magazine Cal y Arena. In 1998 he received the Literature Award for his book Mazatlán: A breath in the river. The jury described him "a brilliant historian". He is remarried to Ángeles Mastretta and has three sons.

Prizes and recognition 

 Premio Nacional de Periodismo Cultural 1986, categoría de artículo de fondo
 Beca Guggenheim (1989)
 Medalla al Mérito, estado de Quintana Roo (1992)
 Premio Mazatlán de Literatura 1998 por Un soplo en el río
 Medalla Gabriela Mistral (Chile) (2001)

Selected books 
Toda la vida (2016, novel) 
Adiós a los padres (2015, novel)  
Pensando pendientes y otras historias conversadas (2012, short stories) 
Una agenda para México 2012 (2012, nonfiction) with Jorge G. Castaneda 
La modernidad fugitiva (Esta edición incluye dos libros clave del autor: Después del milagro, publicado en 1988, y La ceniza y la semilla, publicado en el año 2000. Añade un ensayo sobre la experiencia de los últimos años: Los límites de la democracia mexicana, 2000-2012)  
Regreso al futuro (2011, essays) with Jorge G. Castaneda   
Informe Jalisco: Más allá de la guerra de las drogas (2010, nonfiction by various authors including Aguilar Camín)  
Un futuro para México (2010, essays) with Jorge G. Castaneda 
La invención de México (2010, essays)  
La tragedia de Colosio (2009, "novela sin ficción") 
Pensando en la izquierda (2008, essays)  
La provincia perdida (2007, novel) 
Pensar en Mexico (2006, essays) 
La conspiración de la fortuna (2005, novel) 
Antologia Letras en el Golfo Festival de Literatura 2003 (2003,various authors including Aguilar Camín) ASIN: B00563O2GY
Mandatos del corazón (2002, novel)  
Las mujeres de Adriano (2002, novel)  
México La ceniza y la semilla (2000 3rd edition, nonfiction) 
El resplandor de la madera (1999, novel)  
Un soplo en el río (1997, novel) 
El error de la luna (1995, novel) ; reprinted 2010, 2013 
Diez para los maestros (1993, essays by various authors including Aguilar Camín)  
Subversiones silenciosas: Ensayos de historia y politica de Mexico (Nuevo siglo) (1993, nonfiction) 
A La Sombra De La Revolución Mexicana (1992, nonfiction); reprinted 2010 with Lorenzo Meyer 
Historias conversadas (1992, short stories) 
La guerra de Galio (1990 novel); reprinted 1994 ; 2010 
Despues del Milagro (1989, nonfiction); reprinted 2010 
Historia gráfica de México (1989, with Lorenzo Meyer).
En Torno a La Cultura Nacional (1989, Editor Aguilar Camín) 
Morir en el Golfo (1985, novel); reprinted 2012 
México ante la crisis / Volumen 2. El impacto social y cultural. Las alternativas (1985, nonfiction) with Pablo Gonzalez Casanova 
México ante la crisis / Volumen 1. El contexto internacional y la crisis economica (1985, nonfiction) with Pablo Gonzalez Casanova 
La decadencia del dragon (1985, nonfiction, 2nd ed) 
Saldos De La Revolucion: Historia Y Politica De Mexico 1910-1968 (1984, essays) revised 2010  
Los Dias de Manuel Buendia: Testimonios (1984, nonfiction)  
Caudillo and Peasant in the Mexican Revolution, coautor; Cambridge University Press, 1980
Historia: ¿Para qué?, coautor; Siglo XXI, México, 1980
Con el filtro azul (1979, short stories)  
La frontera nómada, Sonora y la Revolucion Mexicana (history, first edition, Siglo XXI, 1977, second edition 1997, Cal y Arena); 1985 ; 2010 
En torno de la cultura nacional, coautor; Instituto Nacional Indigenista, México, 1976

References

External links
 esmas.com: Héctor Aguilar Camín.

1946 births
Living people
Writers from Quintana Roo
People from Chetumal, Quintana Roo
El Colegio de México alumni
Universidad Iberoamericana alumni
20th-century Mexican historians
Mexican male writers
21st-century Mexican historians